Navi may refer to:

People
Navi (impersonator) (fl. from 1988), Michael Jackson tribute artist
 Navi (born 1980), member of the Japanese musical group GReeeeN
Navi Pillay (born 1941), South African lawyer and former UN High Commissioner for Human Rights
Navi Radjou (born 1970), executive director of the Centre for India and Global Business 
Navi Rawat (born 1977), American actress

Places 
 Navi, Estonia
 Navi Mumbai, Maharashtra, India
 Perini Navi, a shipyard in Italy

Film and television 
 Na'vi, a humanoid alien race in the 2009 movie Avatar
 Na'vi language
 Navi Araz, a villain in the television series 24
 Navi (Kaizoku Sentai Gokaiger), a robotic bird from a Japanese tokusatsu drama
 "NAVI", the term for computers in the Japanese animation Serial Experiments Lain

Video games
 Navi (The Legend of Zelda), a video game character
 Natus Vincere, or "NaVi", an esports organization

Other
 NAVI (band), a Belarusian folk-pop duo
 Navient (NASDAQ: NAVI), an American student debt collection service
 Navi, an alternate name for the star Gamma Cassiopeiae
 Navi, the GPU architecture featured in AMD's Radeon RX 5000 series
 Navi, a character in the Japanese light novel series Dragonar Academy
 Short term for navigation and navigator
 Navi-Key, a control introduced in the Nokia 3110 cell phone product line
 Navi, singular of Nevi'im, a class of prophets in the Hebrew Bible

See also 
 Navvy, a canal worker
 Navy (disambiguation)